Bartlett Maine Estate Winery in Gouldsboro, Maine is the state's oldest winery. It was established in 1983.

See also
List of wineries in New England

References

Further reading
 
 

Buildings and structures in Hancock County, Maine
Wineries in Maine
Companies based in Hancock County, Maine